Miguel de Cervantes Health Care Centre (Miguel de Cervantes H.C.C.) is a health centre located at Alcalá de Henares, Madrid, Spain, which  belongs to the Health Service of Madrid and is assigned to direct public health care.

Location 
It is located at 23 Gustavo Adolfo Bécquer Avenue, Alcalá de Henares (Madrid).

Access 
 From Alcalá de Henares: 
- Public local bus Line L3, from Plaza de Cervantes to Espartales.
- Public local bus Line L10, from Vía Complutense to Espartales.
 From Madrid: Intercity bus line 227, at the interchanger from America Avenue (Madrid) to Espartales – University (Alcalá de Henares).

Characteristics 
It is a public primary health care centre of the Spanish National Health System which belongs to the Health Service of Madrid and it is located at the east side of Madrid Community. The centre was founded on June 26, 2001, initially in a pre fabricated module but the actual building was inaugurated on November 16, 2006, over 2,600 m2 surface. About 25.000 people divided in several (districts) the Espartales, Ciudad 10, University Campus and the Ensanche integrate the population assigned to the IV District of Alcalá de Henares. Its basic health zone is according with censual municipals Districts D6 and D8.

Social-Health Attention 
The centre offers Primary Care health attention of Family Medicine, Pediatrics, Nursing, Physiotherapy, Midwifery and Odontology; as well as social services with a Social Worker. The professional staff is integrated by 11 Family doctors, 5 Pediatricians, 10 Nurses, 2 Physiotherapist, 2 Matron, 1 Odontologist, 1 Social Worker, 6 Administrative Assistants, 1 Nursery assistant and 1 Odontologist assistant. The attention is from Monday to Friday from 08:00 to 21:00 hours of opening
The Centre refers specialist consultations to the Diagnosis and Treatment Integrated Centre Fancisco Diaz and also to the Principe de Asturias University Hospital.

Teaching Centre 
The centre is a teaching centre for practicing and it is connected to: 
 The Multiprofessional Teaching Unit of the EAST Familiar and Community Attention to provide education to residents of Family Doctors Specialists 
 The University of Alcalá to provide tutelary training to students of Medicine or Nursery 
 To the Illustrious Official College of Physicians of Madrid  to retrain Family Doctors 
 moreover, the centre performs practices of sanitary administrative assistant.

Denomination 

Its name is in memorial of Miguel de Cervantes, a distinguished native and universal writer. Some Cervantes's sentences related with health are listed below: 
 “To eat a bit and dinner less, because the whole body health is made in the office of the stomach.”
 “Sorrows were not made for beasts but for men; unless men suffered them a lot and they become beasts.”
 “It is better the pain in the face rather than a spot in the heart.”
 “I will die of old age but I will not fully understand the biped animal called man, because every man is a variety of his species.”
 “Don't walk, Sancho, ungirded and untwisted, because decomposed dress is suggested of a sad mood.”
 “Oh, memory, mortal enemy of my rest!”
 “You would better have a moderate rest, because who does not wake up with the sun does not enjoy the day.”
 “If  jealousy are love sings, it is like the cold sore in the sick man, to get it is a sign of being alive but that is a sick live and not willing.”
 “A good contrition is the best medicine for the illness of the soul.”

See also 

 Spanish National Health System

References

Further reading 
 Ley 12/2001, de 21 de diciembre, de Ordenación Sanitaria de la Comunidad de Madrid. Boletín Oficial de la Comunidad de Madrid. 2001/12/26;(306):8-39. 
 Catálogo de pruebas diagnósticas disponibles desde Atención Primaria. Madrid: Servicio Madrileño de Salud; 2006.
 Ley 6/2009, de 16 de noviembre, de Libertad de Elección en la Sanidad de la Comunidad de Madrid. Boletín Oficial de la Comunidad de Madrid. 2009/11/18; (274):5-6.)
  Decreto 51/2010, de 29 de julio, por el que se regula el ejercicio de la libertad de elección de médico de familia, pediatra y enfermero en Atención Primaria, y de hospital y médico en Atención Especializada en el Sistema Sanitario Público de la Comunidad de Madrid. Boletín Oficial de la Comunidad de Madrid. 2010/08/09; (189):25-7.
 Decreto 52/2010, de 29 de julio, por el que se establecen las estructuras básicas sanitarias y directivas de Atención Primaria del Área Única de Salud de la Comunidad de Madrid. Boletín Oficial de la Comunidad de Madrid. 2010/08/09; (189):28-38.
 Catálogo de Centros de Atención Primaria del SNS y Catálogo Nacional de Hospitales. Madrid: Ministerio de Sanidad, Política Social e Igualdad; 2010/12/31.
  Instituto de Información Sanitaria. Ordenación Sanitaria del Territorio en las comunidades autónomas. Mapa de referencia para el Sistema de Información de Atención Primaria (SIAP) Año 2011. Madrid: Ministerio de Sanidad, Política Social e Igualdad; 2011.

External links 
 Municipality of Alcala de Henares
 Ministry of Health of the Community of Madrid
 School of Medicine of the University of Alcalá
 Prince of Asturias University Hospital
 Ministry of Health (Spain)
 Maps of the area of the Miguel de Cervantes Health Center
 Health web of the Community of Madrid
 Madrid Health Service (SERMAS)
 University of Alcalá (UAH)
 Exterior views of the Miguel de Cervantes Health Center

Buildings and structures in Alcalá de Henares
Health centers